Patania mysisalis is a moth in the family Crambidae. It was described by Francis Walker in 1859. It is found in Madagascar, Sierra Leone and South Africa.

References

Moths described in 1859
Spilomelinae
Moths of Africa